Massimo Gotti (born 27 May 1986) is an Italian former professional footballer who played as a left-back.

Career

Udinese
Gotti signed with Udinese in June 2005. Gotti made his Serie A debut on 5 November 2006 playing for Ascoli in a 2–0 loss against Internazionale.  In January 2007 he returned to Udine.

He then left for Lega Pro clubs, winning Lega Pro Prima Divisione Group B in 2010 and promotion to Serie B.

Empoli (loan)
In July 2010 left for Serie B club Empoli. He was the starting left back of the team (in the first half of the season), only missed a few games to Marco Gorzegno who arrived on 31 August but injured in November.

Ternana
In 2011–12 season he returned to Udine. Despite awarded a shirt number of no.30, he was excluded from the 25-men squad that submitted to UEFA for 2011–12 UEFA Champions League play-off round.

On 25 August 2011, he moved to Lega Pro Prima Divisione side Ternana in co-ownership deal, the day after eliminated by Arsenal. Ternana won promotion to Serie B in June 2012. On 23 June 2012, Ternana signed him outright. Gotti picked no.4 shirt for Ternana in 2012–13 Serie B, which he played once.

Grosseto
On 22 September 2013, he was signed by U.S. Grosseto F.C. on a free transfer.

Matera

L'Aquila
In December 2014 he was signed by L'Aquila.

Honours
Lega Pro Prima Divisione: 2010

References

External links
 AIC profile (data by www.football.it) 
 Lega Serie B profile 
 La Gazzetta dello Sport Profile 
 FIGC National Teams Archive 

Italian footballers
Serie A players
Serie B players
Atalanta B.C. players
Udinese Calcio players
Ascoli Calcio 1898 F.C. players
Calcio Padova players
A.S.D. Portogruaro players
Empoli F.C. players
Ternana Calcio players
F.C. Grosseto S.S.D. players
Association football defenders
Sportspeople from the Province of Bergamo
1986 births
Living people
Footballers from Lombardy